North Conference, Northern Conference, Conference North, or variant, may refer to:

 National League North (formerly Conference North), National League, England, UK; a tier 1 pro soccer league division below elite league
 FIBA Europe Conference North
 Big Northern Conference (Illinois), USA; a highschool athletics conference
 Big North Conference (Michigan), USA; a highschool athletics conference
 Big North Conference (New Jersey), USA; a highschool athletics conference
 Great Northern Conference (Wisconsin), USA; a highschool athletics conference
 Northern Conference cricket team, New Zealand

See also
 
 
 
 Great Northern UP Conference, in the U.S. state of Michigan
 Northern Illinois Conference (disambiguation)
 North Central Conference (disambiguation)
 Northern Division (disambiguation)
 Conference
 Northern (disambiguation)
 North (disambiguation)